ILEA may refer to:

 Indiana Law Enforcement Academy
 Inner London Education Authority
 International Law Enforcement Academies